The Yata-Ngaya Faunal Reserve is found in Central African Republic. It was established in 1960.This site is 4200km².

References

.

Protected areas of the Central African Republic
Faunal reserves